Stuart Turner (born 18 July 1943) is a former English cricketer. Turner was a right-handed batsman who bowled right-arm medium-fast. He was born in Chester, Cheshire.

Turner was a key player for Essex County Cricket Club during their emergence as a force in domestic cricket, towards the twilight of his career they won the County Championship four times in eight seasons. His accuracy, combined with his ability to swing the ball both ways saw him pick up 821 First-class wickets in a career that spanned over twenty years. He was also an adept batsman, capable of scoring centuries from the lower middle order.

After retirement from professional cricket, Turner took up coaching and taught at Forest School, Walthamstow with Edward Hickman until his retirement in 2011. However, he came back to teaching cricket at Avon House Preparatory School in 2017 and is still teaching there now. He teaches with Edward Hickman at Avon House.

References

External links
Stuart Turner at ESPNcricinfo
Stuart Turner at CricketArchive

1943 births
Living people
Sportspeople from Chester
English cricketers
Essex cricketers
KwaZulu-Natal cricketers
Cambridgeshire cricketers
Minor Counties cricketers
D. H. Robins' XI cricketers
T. N. Pearce's XI cricketers